The Vanuatu Police Force (VPF) is the national law enforcement of Vanuatu. The VPF is headquartered in Port Vila and has two specialised arms: a small para-military force, the Vanuatu Mobile Force, and a maritime force, the Vanuatu Police Maritime Wing.

Organisation 
Lieutenant Colonel Arthur Coulton of the Vanuatu Mobile Force was sworn in as the acting police commissioner in 2002.

In a 2006 interview Police Commissioner Lieutenant Colonel Lui Patu Navoko voiced support for the idea that Vanuatu would benefit from having a National Security Council.

Lieutenant Joshua Bong was appointed to a four-year term as police commissioner, on 29 September 2009, replacing Lui Patu Navoko. Bong was terminated in October 2012 by President Iolu Abil. Arthur Caulton, his deputy, was announced as interim commissioner.

Maritime wing 
The Vanuatu Police Maritime Wing currently operates a single Guardian-class patrol boat, RVS Takuare, as well as a variety of small craft including the Australian supplied RVS Mataweli. The Maritime wing primarily operates from RVS Mala outside of Port Vila, an Australian funded base which has a large wharf able to host both Australian and Ni-Vanuatu vessels. Until 2021 the wing operated a single , RVS Tukoro.

History 
Vanuatu has provided police officers to the Regional Assistance Mission to Solomon Islands since July 2003. Ni-Vanuatu police officer Benson Samuels is contingent commander of the ni-Vanuatu police serving as part of RAMSI's Participating Police Force (PPF).

Ranks

See also
 Law of Vanuatu

References

External links
Martin Cassidy's South Pacific Police Insignia Website

 
Government of Vanuatu
Law of Vanuatu